Articulata is a Latin word meaning articulated or jointed. In taxonomy, it is used to refer to various subdivisions.

It may refer to:
Articulata (Brachiopoda), one of two main divisions of the brachiopods having two valves with an articulating hinge
Articulata (Crinoidea), a subclass of crinoids, the only such to survive past the Paleozoic era
Articulata (Cyclostomata), a group of cyclostome bryozoans, also known as Articulina
Articulata hypothesis, a hypothesis treating Annelida and Panarthropoda as sister taxa